Millican may refer to:

People:
 Millican Dalton, self-styled "Professor of Adventure"
 Arthenia J. Bates Millican, American writer and educator
 Charles N. Millican, founding president of the University of Central Florida
 Daniel Millican, American writer/director

 James Millican, American actor
 Lisa Ann Millican, American kidnapping victim
 Peter Millican, professor of philosophy at Oxford University
 Sarah Millican, English stand-up comedian

Places:
 Millican, Oregon
 Millican, Texas
 Millican Estates, Calgary
 Calgary-Millican

In media:
 Millican (album)
 Millican & Nesbitt

See also
 Millikan (disambiguation)
 Milliken (disambiguation)
 Milligan (disambiguation)